Brevort Township is a civil township of Mackinac County in the U.S. state of Michigan.  As of the 2010 census, the township population was 594.

The township was named after Henry Brevort (or Brevoort), a surveyor assigned to subdivide the area in 1845.  Most of the township land is within the eastern portion of the Hiawatha National Forest.  The township includes part of the Mackinac Wilderness.

Communities
It was founded by J. Alley, head of the Alley Lumber Company in 1873. A post office operated from December 1873 until October 1891. Also known as "Alley Town", the community was almost destroyed by fire in 1882.
 Moran is an unincorporated community on M-123 at  approximately 13 miles northwest of St. Ignace. Confusingly, the community is not a part of Moran Township, which is adjacent to Brevort Township on the south and west.  It was initially called "Jacob City", after the president of the German Land Company of Detroit, which sold land to members in 1881–83. In 1883, Jacob was accused of fraud and ousted from the organization. Another member of the group, William B. Moran, loaned the group funds to buy additional land and the settlement was renamed after him in 1883. A post office named Jacob City was established in February 1882 and renamed Moran in January 1883. The office was transferred to and renamed Allenville in April 1898, but a Moran post office was re-established in May 1910. The name of Moran Township and other nearby places named Moran such as East Moran Bay in St. Ignace, West Moran Bay on Lake Michigan, and the Moran River all have a different origin, and instead derive from the French Morin.

Geography

M-123 passed diagonally south–north through the township, and U.S. Route 2 and Interstate 75 are just outside of the township boundaries to the south and east.

Demographics
As of the census of 2000, there were 649 people, 264 households, and 184 families residing in the township.  The population density was 7.0 per square mile (2.7/km2).  There were 561 housing units at an average density of 6.1 per square mile (2.3/km2).  The racial makeup of the township was 79.51% White, 15.10% Native American, 0.15% Asian, and 5.24% from two or more races. Hispanic or Latino of any race were 0.92% of the population.

There were 264 households, out of which 30.7% had children under the age of 18 living with them, 55.7% were married couples living together, 7.2% had a female householder with no husband present, and 30.3% were non-families. 23.9% of all households were made up of individuals, and 10.2% had someone living alone who was 65 years of age or older.  The average household size was 2.46 and the average family size was 2.86.

In the township the population was spread out, with 23.3% under the age of 18, 8.8% from 18 to 24, 25.6% from 25 to 44, 29.0% from 45 to 64, and 13.4% who were 65 years of age or older.  The median age was 40 years. For every 100 females, there were 102.8 males.  For every 100 females age 18 and over, there were 101.6 males.

The median income for a household in the township was $33,611, and the median income for a family was $36,591. Males had a median income of $30,156 versus $21,250 for females. The per capita income for the township was $19,878.  About 6.6% of families and 9.5% of the population were below the poverty line, including 12.9% of those under age 18 and 7.1% of those age 65 or over.

References

External links
Brevort Township official website

Townships in Mackinac County, Michigan
Townships in Michigan
Populated places established in 1881
1881 establishments in Michigan